The Atlanta Journal-Constitution is the only major daily newspaper in the metropolitan area of Atlanta, Georgia. It is the flagship publication of Cox Enterprises. The Atlanta Journal-Constitution is the result of the merger between The Atlanta Journal and The Atlanta Constitution. The two staffs were combined in 1982. Separate publication of the morning Constitution and the afternoon Journal ended in 2001 in favor of a single morning paper under the Journal-Constitution name.

The Atlanta Journal-Constitution has its headquarters in the Atlanta suburb of Dunwoody, Georgia.  It was formerly co-owned with television flagship WSB-TV and six radio stations, which are located separately in midtown Atlanta; the newspaper remained part of Cox Enterprises, while WSB became part of an independent Cox Media Group.

The Atlanta Journal
The Atlanta Journal was established in 1883. Founder E. F. Hoge sold the paper to Atlanta lawyer Hoke Smith in 1887. After the Journal supported presidential candidate Grover Cleveland in the 1892 election, Smith was named as Secretary of the Interior by the victorious Cleveland. Pulitzer Prize–winning novelist Margaret Mitchell worked for the Journal from 1922 to 1926. Important for the development of her 1936 Gone With the Wind were the series of profiles of prominent Georgia Civil War generals she wrote for The Atlanta Journals Sunday magazine, the research for which, scholars believe, led her to her work on the novel. In 1922, the Journal founded one of the first radio broadcasting stations in the South, WSB. The radio station and the newspaper were sold in 1939 to James Middleton Cox, founder of what would become Cox Enterprises.  The Journal carried the motto "Covers Dixie like the Dew".

The Atlanta Constitution

In 1868, Carey Wentworth Styles, along with his joint venture partners James Anderson and (future Atlanta mayor) William Hemphill purchased a small newspaper,  the Atlanta Daily Opinion which they renamed The Constitution, as it was originally known, was first published on June 16, 1868.  Its name changed to The Atlanta Constitution in October 1869. Hemphill became the business manager, a position that he retained until 1901. When Styles was unable to liquidate his holdings in an Albany newspaper, he could not pay for his purchase of the Constitution. He was forced to surrender his interest in the paper to Anderson and Hemphill, who then each owned one half. In 1870 Anderson sold his one half interest in the paper to Col. E. Y. Clarke. In active competition with other Atlanta newspapers, Hemphill hired special trains (one engine and car) to deliver newspapers to the Macon marketplace. The newspaper became such a force that by 1871 it had overwhelmed the Daily Intelligencer, the only Atlanta paper to survive the American Civil War. In August 1875 its name changed to The Atlanta Daily Constitution for two weeks, then to The Constitution again for about a year. In 1876 Captain Evan Howell (a former Intelligencer city editor) purchased the 50 percent interest in the paper from E. Y. Clarke, and became its editor-in-chief. That same year, Joel Chandler Harris began writing for the paper. He soon created the character of Uncle Remus, a black storyteller, as a way of recounting stories from African-American culture. The Howell family would eventually own full interest in the paper from 1902 until 1950.

In October 1876 the newspaper was renamed as The Daily Constitution, before settling on the name The Atlanta Constitution in September 1881. During the 1880s, editor Henry W. Grady was a spokesman for the "New South", encouraging industrial development as well as the founding of Georgia Tech in Atlanta. Evan Howell's family would come to own The Atlanta Constitution from 1902 to 1950.

The Constitution established one of the first radio broadcasting stations, WGM, which began operating on March 17, 1922, two days after the debut of the Journal's WSB. However, WGM ceased operations after just over a year. Its equipment was donated to what was then known as Georgia School of Technology, which used it to help launch WBBF (later WGST, now WGKA AM 920) in January 1924.

In late 1947, the Constitution established radio station WCON (AM 550). Subsequently, it received approval to begin operating an FM station, WCON-FM 98.5 mHz, and a TV station, WCON-TV, on channel 2.

But the 1950 merger with the Journal required major adjustments. Contemporary Federal Communications Commission "duopoly" regulations disallowed owning more than one AM, FM or TV station in a given market, and the Atlanta Journal already owned WSB AM 750 and WSB-FM 104.5, as well as WSB-TV on channel 8. In order to comply with the duopoly restrictions, WCON and the original WSB-FM were shut down. The WCON-TV construction permit was canceled, and WSB-TV was allowed to move from channel 8 to channel 2. In addition, in order to standardize with its sister stations, WCON-FM's call letters were changed to WSB-FM.

Ralph McGill, editor for the Constitution in the 1940s, was one of the few southern newspaper editors to support the American Civil Rights Movement.  Other noteworthy editors of The Atlanta Constitution include J. Reginald Murphy. "Reg" Murphy gained notoriety after being kidnapped in 1974. Murphy later moved to the West Coast and served as editor of the San Francisco Examiner.

Celestine Sibley was an award-winning reporter, editor, and beloved columnist for the Constitution from 1941 to 1999, and also wrote 25 fiction and nonfiction books about Southern life.  After her death, the Georgia House of Representatives named its press gallery in her honor as a mark of affection and respect.

From the 1970s until his death in 1994, Lewis Grizzard was a popular humor columnist for the Constitution.  He portrayed Southern "redneck" culture with a mixture of ridicule and respect.

The Constitution won numerous Pulitzer Prizes. In 1931 it won a Pulitzer Prize for Public Service for exposing corruption at the local level. In 1959, The Constitution won a Pulitzer Prize for Editorial Writing for Ralph McGill's editorial "A Church, A School..." In 1967 it was awarded another Pulitzer Prize for Eugene Patterson's editorials. (Patterson later left his post as editor over a dispute over an op-ed piece.) In 1960, Jack Nelson won the Pulitzer Prize for local reporting, by exposing abuses at Milledgeville State Hospital for the mentally ill.

Even after newsrooms were combined in 1982, the papers were published in independent editions. In 1988 the Pulitzer Prize for Editorial Cartooning went to the  Constitution's Doug Marlette. Editorial cartoonist Mike Luckovich received Pulitzer Prizes in 1995 and 2006. Cynthia Tucker received a 2007 Pulitzer Prize for Commentary.

Merger
Cox Enterprises bought the Constitution in June 1950, bringing both newspapers under one ownership and combining sales and administrative offices. Separate newsrooms were kept until 1982. Both newspapers continued to be published for another two decades, with much of the same content except for timely editing.  The Journal, an afternoon paper, led the morning Constitution until the 1970s, when afternoon papers began to fall out of favor with subscribers. In November 2001, the two papers, which were once fierce competitors, merged to produce one daily morning paper, The Atlanta Journal-Constitution. The two papers had published a combined edition on weekends and holidays for years previously.

Prior to the merger, both papers planned to start TV stations: WSB-TV on channel 8 for the Journal, and WCON-TV on channel 2 for the Constitution.  Only WSB got on the air, beginning in 1948 as the first TV station in the Deep South.  It moved from channel 8 to WCON's allotment on channel 2 in 1951 to avoid TV interference from the nearby channel 9.  (WROM-TV since moved, leaving WGTV on 8, after it was also used by WLWA-TV, now WXIA-TV 11.)  This was also necessary to satisfy Federal Communications Commission (FCC) rules preventing the excessive concentration of media ownership, preventing the combined paper from running two stations.

In 1989, Bill Dedman received the Pulitzer Prize for Investigative Reporting for The Color of Money, his exposé on racial discrimination in mortgage lending, or redlining, by Atlanta banks. The newspapers' editor, Bill Kovach, had resigned in November 1988 after the stories on banks and others had ruffled feathers in Atlanta and among corporate leadership, some of whom complained of a "take-no-prisoners" editorial approach.

In 1993, Mike Toner received the Pulitzer Prize for Explanatory Reporting for When Bugs Fight Back, his series about organisms and their resistance to antibiotics and pesticides.

Julia Wallace was named the first female editor of The Atlanta Journal-Constitution in 2002. She was named Editor of the Year 2004 by Editor & Publisher magazine.

Mike Luckovich won the Pulitzer Prize for Editorial cartooning a second time in 2006. He had first received it in 1995 under The Atlanta Constitution banner.

Circulation
The paper used to cover all 159 counties in Georgia, and the bordering counties of western North Carolina, where many Atlantans vacation or have second homes. In addition it had some circulation in other bordering communities, such as Tallahassee, Florida, where the Sunday Atlanta Journal-Constitution was available. Due to the downturn in the newspaper industry and competing media sources, The Atlanta Journal-Constitution contracted distribution dramatically in the late 2000s to serve only the metro area. From Q1 of 2007 to Q1 of 2010, daily circulation plunged over 44%.

Headquarters
The Atlanta Journal-Constitution has its headquarters in Perimeter Center, an office district of Dunwoody, Georgia. Previously the AJC headquarters were in Downtown Atlanta near the Five Points district. In August 2009, the AJC occupied less than 30 percent of its downtown building, which had become outdated and costly to maintain. Later that year, the AJC consolidated its printing operations by transferring the downtown production center to the Gwinnett County facility. In 2010 the newspaper relocated its headquarters to leased offices in Dunwoody, a northern suburb of Atlanta.  In November 2010, the company donated its former downtown headquarters to the city of Atlanta, which plans to convert the building into a fire and police training academy.

Controversy 
In 1996, The Atlanta Journal-Constitution was the first newspaper to report on Centennial Olympic Park bombing hero Richard Jewell being accused of actually being the bomber, citing leaked information of the Federal Bureau of Investigation. Even after Jewell was cleared of any accusations by the FBI, the AJC refused to issue an apology and still remains the only paper to have not retracted their story falsely accusing him of terrorism. The court case regarding this has been dropped after the death of both Richard Jewell and the initial reporter.

Organization of the newspaper
The Atlanta Journal-Constitution has four major sections daily. On Sundays, it has additional sections. The main section usually consists of Georgia news, national news, international news, and business news. The Metro section includes major headlines from the Metro Atlanta area. The Metro section usually reports the weather forecast. The Sports section reports sports-related news. Before social media became popular, the Metro and Sports sections contained "The Vent" features, where readers expressed opinions about current events. The Living section contains articles, recipes, reviews, movie times, and puzzles including Sudoku, crossword puzzle, and word scramble; plus a full page of color comics daily. Comics are printed in a separate section in Sunday editions.

See also

 Atlanta Constitution Building (former headquarters)
 Richard Jewell
 Maude Andrews Ohl 
 Media in Atlanta
 List of newspapers in Georgia (U.S. state)

References

Further reading
Merrill, John C. and Harold A. Fisher. The world's great dailies: profiles of fifty newspapers (1980) pp 68–72
Perry, Chuck. 2004. "Atlanta Journal-Constitution". New Georgia Encyclopedia Georgia Humanities Council.

External links

 
 AJCePaper
 2021 Press On campaign
 AJC Journalists pages
 
 
 

Newspapers published in Atlanta
Cox Newspapers
Pulitzer Prize-winning newspapers
Daily newspapers published in the United States
2001 establishments in Georgia (U.S. state)
Publications established in 2001
Pulitzer Prize for Public Service winners